Commission on the Application of Payment Limitations for Agriculture — The 2002 farm bill (P.L. 107-171, Sec. 1605; 7 U.S.C. 7993), required the creation of a commission to study various economic consequences from a further tightening of the limits on per person farm subsidy payments.  The Commission was directed to deliver its report within one year, making it due in May 2003.

See also

Payment limitations (agriculture)

References 

United States Department of Agriculture